The 2022 W Series Barcelona round was the second round of eight in the 2022 W Series, and took place at the Circuit de Barcelona-Catalunya in Spain on 21st May 2022. The event was an undercard to the 2022 Formula One World Championship round at the same circuit.

Report

Background
For the first of two events in 2022, the Tatuus–Toyota FT-60 chassis and engine combination would be used instead of the usual Tatuus–Alfa Romeo F3 T-318 car due to logistical hurdles related to the tight turnarounds between events.

Jamie Chadwick led the drivers' championship on 50 points, 27 points ahead of Nerea Martí. Jenner Racing led the teams' championship on 51 points, 10 points ahead of the Quantfury W Series Team.

Classification

Practice

Qualifying

Race

 – Driver did not finish the race, but was classified having completed 90% of the race distance.

Championship standings

Drivers' Championship standings

Teams' Championship standings

 Note: Only the top five positions are included.

See also
 2022 Spanish Grand Prix

Notes

References

External links
 Official website

|- style="text-align:center"
|width="35%"|Previous race:
|width="30%"|W Series2022 season
|width="40%"|Next race:

W Series Barcelona
W Series Barcelona
Barcelona
W Series Barcelona